The Kenai Spur Highway is a  highway on the Kenai Peninsula in Alaska. The road begins at a junction with the Sterling Highway in Soldotna and provides access to  the towns of Kenai and Nikiski, dead-ending at the entrance to the Captain Cook State Recreation Area. Visitors traveling between the  Homer area and these areas can bypass Soldotna and access the Spur Highway via Kalifornsky Beach Road. The highway is a four-lane undivided road inside of the cities of Soldotna and Kenai, and a two-lane road elsewhere. The northern section of the road is also known as the North Kenai Road. In 2018 the Federal Highway Administration approved a plan to extend the road by eight miles to improve access to remote homes in the area.

Major intersections

References

Transportation in Kenai Peninsula Borough, Alaska
State highways in Alaska